Ramone Rochester (born 18 February 1997), known professionally as Ramz, is a British rapper and singer and songwriter from London. He is best known for his hit single "Barking", which peaked at number two on the UK Singles Chart in January 2018.

Early life
Rochester was born 18 February 1997 in Mitcham, South London. He attended St Mark's Academy, where he was excluded several times in secondary school, and then attended Harris Academy Merton sixth form. Rochester eventually went to study Sports Development at the University of Portsmouth before dropping out the same year to focus on music. He is also an avid supporter of Arsenal F.C.

Career
Rochester released his first song "I'm On My Grind" in February 2017 to little notice. He further released several other tracks in March 2017 and July 2017. Whilst releasing music, Rochester was attempting to find employment after leaving university, eventually finding a job working at supermarket chain Sainsbury's.

In September 2017, Rochester formally released "Barking" alongside a music video. The song entered the UK Singles Chart on 14 December 2017 at number 41, before peaking at number two on 19 January 2018.

In July 2019 Ramz received help after posting the word "suicide" on Instagram.

Personal life

Ramz was in an on-again off-again relationship with London based R&B musician Mnelia, which began in 2017 when the pair met at university. Their son Ro, was born in December 2020. The couple separated indefinitely in early 2021.

Discography

Extended plays

Singles

Guest appearances

References

1997 births
Living people
English male rappers
English songwriters
People from Mitcham
Rappers from London
Alumni of the University of Portsmouth
British male songwriters